is a quasi-national park in the Kantō region of Honshū in Japan. It is rated a protected landscape (category V) according to the IUCN.

Geography

Suigō-Tsukuba Quasi-National Park covers an area in southeast Ibaraki Prefecture and northeast Chiba Prefecture. The park was established on March 3, 1953 to protect natural areas and cultural heritage of Lake Kasumigaura in Ibaraki Prefecture to the north, the Tone River basin on the border of Ibaraki Prefecture and Chiba Prefecture, and the areas around Cape Inubō, Byōbugaura and Cape Gyōbumi in Chiba Prefecture to the south. In 1969 the areas around Mount Tsukuba and Mount Kaba in Ibaraki Prefecture, not adjacent to other areas of the park, were added to Suigō-Tsukuba.

Administration

Like all quasi-national parks in Japan, the park is managed by the local prefectural governments. Suigō-Tsukuba Quasi-National Park, which spans over two prefectures, is jointly administered by Ibaraki and Chiba prefectures.

Gallery

See also
List of national parks of Japan

References

External links

Suigō-Tsukuba Quasi-National Park, World Database on Protected Areas
National Parks of Japan
水郷筑波国定公園

National parks of Japan
Parks and gardens in Ibaraki Prefecture
Parks and gardens in Chiba Prefecture
Protected areas established in 1953